The 1977–78 Washington State Cougars men's basketball team represented Washington State University for the 1977–78 NCAA Division I men's basketball season. Led by sixth-year head coach George Raveling, the Cougars were members of the Pacific-8 Conference and played their home games on campus at the Performing Arts Coliseum in Pullman, Washington.

During their final road trip, they lost twice by one point in Los Angeles to #4 UCLA  and USC. WSU won their final three games, all at home, concluding with the rival Washington Huskies on Saturday night, with over 11,800 in attendance.

References

External links
Sports Reference – Washington State Cougars: 1977–78 basketball season

Washington State Cougars men's basketball seasons
Washington State Cougars
Washington State
Washington State